Alfred Henry Hanscom (1819 1880) was the Speaker of the Michigan House of Representatives in 1845.

Early life
Hanscom was born in 1819 in Rochester, New York to parents Sarah and George George Hansom.

Career
Hanscom served as a member of the Michigan House of Representatives from the Oakland County district in 1842 and then again in 1845. During his term as 1845, he also held the position of Speaker of the Michigan House of Representatives. Hanscom was a delegate to Michigan state constitutional convention of 1850. Hanscom was the United States Consul to Rio Grande do Sul from 1854 to 1857.

Personal life
Hanscom married Jane A. Forsythe in 1838. Later, on August 12, 1859, he married Adelia Weller.

Death
Hanscom moved to Ontonagon County, Michigan around 1850, and then died around thirty years later.

References

1819 births
1880s deaths
Politicians from Rochester, New York
People from Ontonagon County, Michigan
Speakers of the Michigan House of Representatives
Democratic Party members of the Michigan House of Representatives
American consuls
19th-century American politicians
19th-century American diplomats